Pentameris pictigluma is a species of flowering plant in the family Poaceae, native to Cameroon in West Africa, Ethiopia to Tanzania in East Africa, and Yemen. It was first described by Ernst Gottlieb von Steudel in 1854 as Aira pictigluma.

Varieties
, Plants of the World Online accepted the following varieties:
Pentameris pictigluma var. gracilis (S.M.Phillips) Galley & H.P.Linder – Ethiopia and Kenya
Pentameris pictigluma var. mannii (Stapf ex C.E.Hubb.) Galley & H.P.Linder – Cameroon
Pentameris pictigluma var. pictigluma – Ethiopia, Kenya, Rwanda, Sudan, Tanzania, Uganda and Yemen

Conservation
Under the synonym Pentaschistis mannii, Pentameris pictigluma var. mannii, endemic to Cameroon, was assessed as "near threatened" in the 2000 IUCN Red List.

References

Danthonioideae
Flora of Cameroon
Flora of Ethiopia
Flora of Kenya
Flora of Rwanda
Flora of Sudan
Flora of Tanzania
Flora of Uganda
Flora of Yemen
Plants described in 1854